Ezekiel Skinner (1777–1885) was a colonial agent of the American Colonization Society in Liberia from 12 August 1835 until 25 September 1836.

References

Agents and Governors of Liberia
Americo-Liberian people
1777 births
1885 deaths